Salardú is a locality located in the municipality of Naut Aran, in Province of Lleida province, Catalonia, Spain. As of 2020, it has a population of 630. Salardú is the capital of the municipality of Naut Aran.

Geography 
Salardú is located 171km north-northeast of Lleida.

References

Populated places in the Province of Lleida